An Assassin's Diary is a book written by Arthur Bremer and Harding Lemay and released in 1973. It was based on part of the diary of Bremer, the would-be assassin of Alabama governor George Wallace. Bremer shot Wallace on May 15, 1972, at the Laurel Shopping Center in Laurel, Maryland, while Wallace was in the midst of his third campaign for President.

In the book, Bremer says he was not particularly opposed to Wallace's political agenda, which many had branded as white supremacist; his primary motive was to become famous as he had also stalked President Richard Nixon.

Paul Schrader was partly inspired by Bremer's diary when he wrote the screenplay for the 1976 film Taxi Driver, which was directed by Martin Scorsese. Peter Gabriel's 1980 song "Family Snapshot," from Peter Gabriel (III) was inspired by An Assassin's Diary.

Reviews
In the essay "The Art and Arts of E. Howard Hunt", Gore Vidal assesses Bremer's writing style and notes the apparent contradiction between Bremer's lucid prose and his characterization as a person with a mediocre intellect.

References

External links
Portrait of an Assassin: Arthur Bremer, with quotes from his diary
Bremer Arthur Diary Book of from the Internet Archive

1973 non-fiction books
Diaries
George Wallace